"Kilkelly, Ireland" is a contemporary ballad composed by American songwriter Peter Jones. It tells the story of an Irish family whose son emigrated to America, via a series of letters sent from the father back in Kilkelly. It has five stanzas, covering the period from 1860 to 1892.

Background
In the late 1970s or early 1980s, Peter Jones discovered a collection of century-old letters in his parents' attic in Bethesda, Maryland. The letters had been sent by his great-great-great grandfather, Byran Hunt, to his son, Jones' great-great grandfather, John Hunt, who had emigrated from Kilkelly, County Mayo, to the United States in 1855 and worked on the railroad. As Byran was illiterate, the letters were dictated to the local schoolmaster, Pat McNamara (d. 1902), who often wrote letters on behalf of his neighbors who were unable to read and write.

Covering the years 1858 to 1892, the Hunt letters shared family news of births, deaths, and marriages, and reports of the annual harvest. One letter reported that a brother who had sought his fortune in England had returned and was thinking of buying land. John Hunt was never far from his father's thoughts and the letters expressed the love and affection his family in Ireland still held for him. The last letter, dated February 1892, was written by John Hunt's brother, D. Hunt, informing him of the death of their father. Peter Jones decided to compose a ballad based on the contents of the letters.

Description
Presented as a series of letters, the ballad has five stanzas covering the time period from 1860 to 1892. The ballad conveys "the effects of poverty, famine and emigration on one Irish family" while also expressing the universal theme of the sadness and longing experienced by families who have been separated permanently by emigration.

Covers
"Kilkelly, Ireland" was first recorded on Fast Folk Musical Magazine (FF 207, September 1983) by Laura Burns and Roger Rosen in New York; a live version performed by an ensemble including Nikki Matheson, Jack Hardy, Robin Batteau and Richard Meyer at The Bottom Line in Greenwich Village was also released on Fast Folk in 1986 (FF 306 Live from the Bottom Line). It was subsequently recorded in Ireland by Danny Doyle on his album Twenty Years A-Growing (1987). The ballad appeared on the 1990s Irish music album Bringing It All Back Home. It has been covered by many artists, including Robbie O'Connell, Mick Moloney, Jimmy Keane, Atwater-Donnelly, Seamus Kennedy, The Dubliners, Seán Keane, Ciara Considine, Marc Gunn, David Gans (with Eric Rawlins), and Empty Hats.

Notes

References

Sources

External links
Kilkelly, Ireland - The diary of Pat McNamara, the schoolmaster
Letters written to John Hunt by Patrick McNamara, school master in Tavrane School, Kilkelly, County Mayo
Robbie O'Connell & Finbar Clancy – Kilkelly Ireland Song (1995) (video)

American songs
Songs about cities
Songs about Ireland
Irish-American culture
Year of song missing
Works about human migration